Avengers: Endgame (Original Motion Picture Soundtrack) is the film score for the Marvel Studios film Avengers: Endgame composed and conducted by Alan Silvestri. Hollywood Records released the soundtrack album digitally on April 26, 2019, with the physical formats being released on May 24, 2019.

Background
In June 2016, Alan Silvestri, who composed the score for The Avengers, was revealed to be returning to score both Infinity War and Endgame. Discussing the tone of the film, Silvestri said that the Russos wanted it to be "operatic"  for both films, with Endgame needing an "aggressive musical approach". He stated that he found the film's pace to be "invigorating, after having thunderous percussion and powerful brass propelling the massive battle sequences". Silvestri reprises his themes from the previous Avengers films and Captain America: The First Avenger, as well as several other MCU themes, including Christophe Beck's Ant-Man theme, Michael Giacchino's Doctor Strange theme, and Pinar Toprak's Captain Marvel theme. Silvestri also reassured fans that Thanos's theme from Infinity War was present in the film. The score was recorded at Abbey Road Studios in London with the London Symphony Orchestra consisting of about 95 musicians with Silvestri and orchestrator Mark Graham conducting the sessions. Scoring concluded in late March 2019.

Several classic rock songs are featured in the film, with four of them featured on the soundtrack. The film also includes "Come and Get Your Love" by Redbone and "It's Been a Long, Long Time" by Jule Styne and Sammy Cahn, with these songs previously included in the soundtracks for Guardians of the Galaxy and Captain America: The Winter Soldier, respectively. Other songs not included on the film's soundtrack release include Richard Sherman's "Make Way for Tomorrow Today", as arranged by Silvestri, "Doom and Gloom" by the Rolling Stones, "Hey Lawdy Mama" by Steppenwolf, "Supersonic Rocket Ship" by the Kinks, and "Dear Mr. Fantasy" by Traffic.

A music video for the track "Portals", used for the scene where Doctor Strange and his fellow Masters of the Mystic Arts gather reinforcements to help the Avengers in the final showdown with Thanos, was released on June 13.

Track listing
All music composed and conducted by Alan Silvestri.

Charts

Accolades

References

2019 soundtrack albums
2010s film soundtrack albums
Marvel Cinematic Universe: Phase Three soundtracks
Avengers (film series)
Alan Silvestri soundtracks